Peter Forbes may refer to:

 Peter Forbes (actor) (born 1960), Scottish actor
 Peter Forbes (author), science writer and journalist
 D. Peter Forbes (born 1940), political figure in New Brunswick, Canada
 Peter W. Forbes (1850–1923), California politician, born in Prince Edward Island, Canada